Michak (also Romanized as Mīchak; also known as Mishake) is a village in Aq Kahriz Rural District, Nowbaran District, Saveh County, Markazi Province, Iran. At the 2006 census, its population was 67, in 34 families.

References 

Populated places in Saveh County